Mohammad-e Olya (also Romanized as Moḩammad-e ‘Olyā; also known as Mollā’ī) is a village in Kheyrgu Rural District, Alamarvdasht District, Lamerd County, Fars Province, Iran. At the 2006 census, its population was 160, in 33 families.

References 

Populated places in Lamerd County